The executive, also referred as the executive branch or executive power, is the term commonly used to describe that part of government which enforces the law, and has overall responsibility for the governance of a state.

Function 
The scope of executive power varies greatly depending on the political context in which it emerges, and it can change over time in a given country. In democratic countries, the executive often exercises broad influence over national politics, though limitations are often applied to the executive.

In political systems based on the separation of powers, such as the USA, government authority is distributed between several branches in order to prevent power being concentrated in the hands of a single person or group. To achieve this, each branch is subject to checks by the other two; in general, the role of the legislature is to pass laws, which are then enforced by the executive, and interpreted by the judiciary. The executive can be also be the source of certain types of law, such as a decree or executive order.

In those that use fusion of powers, typically parliamentary systems, the executive forms the government and its members generally belong to the political party that controls the legislature or "parliament". Since the executive requires the support or approval of the legislature, the two bodies are "fused" together, rather than being independent. The principle of parliamentary sovereignty means powers possessed by the executive are solely dependent on those granted by the legislature, which can also subject its actions to judicial review. However, the executive often has wide-ranging powers stemming from control of the government bureaucracy, especially in the areas of overall economic or foreign policy.

Ministers

In parliamentary systems, the executive is responsible to the elected legislature, i.e. must maintain the confidence of the legislature (or one part of it, if bicameral). In certain circumstances (varying by state), the legislature can express its lack of confidence in the executive, which causes either a change in governing party or group of parties or a general election. Parliamentary systems have a head of government (who leads the executive, often called ministers) normally distinct from the head of state (who continues through governmental and electoral changes). In the Westminster type of parliamentary system, the principle of separation of powers is not as entrenched as in some others. Members of the executive (ministers), are also members of the legislature, and hence play an important part in both the writing and enforcing of law. In presidential systems, the directly elected head of government appoints the ministers. The ministers can be directly elected by voters.

In this context, the executive consists of a leader or leader of an office or multiple offices.  Specifically, the top leadership roles of the executive branch may include:

head of state – often the monarch, the president or the supreme leader, the chief public representative and living symbol of national unity. 
head of government – often the prime minister, overseeing the administration of all affairs of state.
defence minister – overseeing the armed forces, determining military policy, and managing external safety.
interior minister – overseeing the police forces, enforcing the law, and managing internal control. 
foreign minister – overseeing the diplomatic service, determining foreign policy and managing foreign relations.
finance minister – overseeing the treasury, determining fiscal policy and managing national budget.
justice minister – overseeing criminal prosecutions, corrections, enforcement of court orders.

Presidents and ministers
In a presidential system, the leader of the executive is both the head of state and government.

In a parliamentary system, a cabinet minister responsible to the legislature is the head of government, while the head of state is usually a largely ceremonial monarch or president.

See also
 Constitution
 Diarchy
 Legal reform
 Rule according to higher law

References 

Constitutional law
Separation of powers
Public law